Tõstamaa Secondary School is a secondary school in Tõstamaa, Estonia.  It is located in a manor house since the 1921–22 academic year. The children of Tõstamaa have been schooled for more than three centuries.

Today, the school has a faculty of about twenty-five, who teach about 260 students in the primary and secondary classrooms.

References

External links
Official website 

Schools in Estonia
Tõstamaa Parish
Buildings and structures in Pärnu County